Esmoriz Ginásio Clube is a volleyball team based in Esmoriz, Portugal, that plays in the Portuguese first division.

Achievements
 Portuguese Volleyball League A1: 2
1982/83, 1983/84

 Portuguese Volleyball Cup: 1
1981/82

Portuguese volleyball teams